Thirumuruganpoondi is a Municipality in Tirupur District in the Indian state of Tamil Nadu.

Etymology
The place derives its name from the Murugan temple: Thirumuruganatheeswar Temple present in the town.

Geography
The village is about 7 km from Tirupur city and about 4 km from the Avinashi.

Demographics
 India census, Thirumuruganpoondi had a population of 18,459. Males constitute 52% of the population and females 48%. A.Thirumuruganpoondi has an average literacy rate of 69%, higher than the national average of 59.5%; with 58% of the males and 42% of females literate. 12% of the population is under 6 years of age.

Landmark
Thirumuruganatheeswar Temple.

References

Neighbourhoods and suburbs of Tiruppur